The First Tractor  is the title of works of the following authors, usually as government-commissioned or -mandated inspirational or aspirational works of socialist realism.

Vladimir Yelchaninov, painting
Boris Goller, play
Victor Tsigal, painting
Valentin Chekmasov, painting
Tamara Abakeliya, painting
Vladimir Krikhatsky, painting